Idea durvillei is a large butterfly that belongs to the danaid group of the family Nymphalidae. It was described by Jean Baptiste Boisduval in 1832. It is found in the Australasian realm. The name honours Jules Dumont d'Urville.

Subspecies
I. d. durvillei (Misool, Gebe, Waigeu)
I. d. theia (Fruhstorfer, 1903) (Halmahera, Ternate, Bachan, Obi)
I. d. hemera (Fruhstorfer, 1903) (Biak)
I. d. keyensis (Fruhstorfer, 1899) (Kai Island, Aru)
I. d. nike (Fruhstorfer, 1903) (West Irian, Mioswar, Jobi Island)
I. d. metris (Fruhstorfer, 1903) (Salawati)

References

External links
"Idea Fabricius, 1807" at Markku Savela's Lepidoptera and Some Other Life Forms

Butterflies described in 1832
Idea (butterfly)